Kongō Masahiro (18 November 1948 - 12 August 2014) was a former sumo wrestler from Hokkaidō, Japan. His highest rank was sekiwake and he won a top division tournament championship in 1975. He was a sumo coach and head of the Nishonoseki stable from 1976 until 2013.

Career
He was born in Fukagawa as Masahiro Yoshizawa, and joined the Nishonoseki stable (home of the great Taihō) in May 1964 at the age of 15. He initially wrestled under the shikona of Oyoshizawa, based on his own surname. He first appeared on the banzuke ranking sheets in July 1964 and won all seven of his bouts, taking the jonokuchi championship with a perfect 7–0 record. However his progress slowed somewhat after that. In 1966 he made the third makushita division, and gradually climbed up to makushita 3 before dropping to makushita 6 for the July 1969 tournament. There he took his second divisional championship, again with an unbeaten 7–0 score, and was promoted to the second jūryō division, giving him elite sekitori status. He was relatively light for a sumo wrestler at just . To mark his promotion he was given the new name of Kongō. He remained in the jūryō division for just over a year, recording a couple of make-koshi or losing scores, but in May and July 1970 he won two consecutive jūryō championships to earn promotion to the top makuuchi division.

He was unable to maintain the rank however, scoring only 5–10. In September 1974 he defeated yokozuna Kitanoumi on the opening day, earning him his first kinboshi or gold star, and at the end of the tournament he was awarded his first sanshō or special prize for Outstanding Performance. He returned to komusubi for the following tournament.

The highlight of his career came in July 1975 when he won the top division championship from the maegashira 1 ranking. Yokozuna Wajima and ōzeki Takanohana both missed the tournament through injury. Kongō defeated Kitanoumi once again on the 7th day and finished one win ahead of fellow maegashira Aobajō with a fine 13–2 record. He won his third Outstanding Performance prize and was promoted straight to sekiwake for the following tournament. This was to be his highest rank, as he could score only 6–9 in the September 1975 tournament and never managed to return to sekiwake.

Retirement from sumo
In 1975 Kongō's stablemaster, former ōzeki Saganohana, died and his widow asked Kongō to marry her second daughter and take over the running of Nishonoseki stable. Kongō agreed and he retired from active competition in 1976 at the age of 27. However, before the marriage could be officially registered, the daughter ran out on Kongō and so the widow adopted him as her foster son instead. and he changed his name to Masahiro Kitamura. Veteran Kirinji, already in the top division when Kongō took over, remained active until 1988, and Kongō produced several other sekitori, such as Hōō, Daitetsu and Daizen. However, with the stablemaster in poor health it went into a gradual decline. Kongō was hospitalized following a stroke in October 2012.  In January 2013, the stable's three remaining wrestlers retired and the stable was closed. Kongō himself retired from the Sumo Association in June 2013.

Death
He died of pneumonia on August 12, 2014.

Career record

See also
 Glossary of sumo terms
 List of past sumo wrestlers
 List of sumo tournament top division champions
 List of sumo tournament second division champions
List of sekiwake

References

External links
 Full tournament results

1948 births
2014 deaths
Japanese sumo wrestlers
Sumo people from Hokkaido
Sekiwake